Ink Master: Revenge is the seventh season of the tattoo reality competition Ink Master that aired on Spike on March 1 and concluded on May 24, 2016 with a total of 13 episodes. The show is hosted and judged by Jane's Addiction guitarist Dave Navarro, with accomplished tattoo artists Chris Núñez and Oliver Peck serving as series regular judges. The winner will receive a $100,000 prize, a feature in Inked Magazine and the title of Ink Master.

The premise of this season was featuring eight contestants competing against eight returning veterans in an elimination-style competition.

This season saw the return of eight veterans; season one contestant James Vaughn, who originally finished the competition in 3rd place, season two contestants Sarah Miller and Jesse Smith, who originally finished the competition as the runner-up and in 5th place respectively, season three contestant Jime Litwalk, who originally finished the competition as the runner-up, season four contestants Walter "Sausage" Frank and Matti Hixson, who originally finished the competition as the runner-up and in 3rd place respectively, season five contestant James "Cleen Rock One" Steinke, who originally finished the competition as the runner-up, and season six contestant Mark S. "St. MarQ" Agee, who originally finished the competition in 12th place.

The winner of the seventh season of Ink Master was Anthony Michaels, with James "Cleen Rock One" Steinke being the runner-up.

Judging and ranking

Judging Panel
The judging panel is responsible for passing judgement on each artist. They collaborate and use information from their own perception, the audience vote, human canvas vote, and the winner's worst vote to determine who should be sent home. Weight of decisions is set by the terms of the challenge skill.

Human Canvas Jury
After the tattoos are completed, the canvases for the challenge gather and vote on the best and worst of that day's tattoos. While the primary judges have the final say, the weight of the canvas vote does affect the judging panels final decision.

Contestants
Names, experience, and cities stated are at time of filming.

Returning veterans

Contestant progress
 Indicates the contestant was a Newcomer.
 Indicates the contestant was a Veteran.

  The contestant won Ink Master.
 The contestant was the runner-up.
 The contestant finished third in the competition.
 The contestant advanced to the finale.
 The contestant won Best Tattoo of the Day.
 The contestant was among the top.
 The contestant received positive critiques.
 The contestant received negative critiques.
 The contestant was in the bottom.
 The contestant was in the bottom and voted Worst Tattoo of the Day by the Human Canvas Jury.
 The contestant was eliminated from the competition.
 The contestant was voted Worst Tattoo of the Day and was eliminated from the competition.
 The contestant returned as a guest for that episode.

Episodes

External links
 
 
 

2016 American television seasons
Ink Master